A time to die is a phrase from Chapter 3 of the Book of Ecclesiastes in the Bible.

A Time to Die or Time to Die may also refer to:

Film and television
 A Time to Die (1982 film), a 1982 film by Matt Cimber
 Time to Die (1985 film), a 1985 Colombian film
 A Time to Die, a 1991 film starring Traci Lords
 Time to Die, a 2007 film by Dorota Kędzierzawska
 "A Time to Die", an episode of Tales of the Unexpected

Literature
 A Time to Die: The Attica Prison Revolt, a 1975 book by Tom Wicker
 A Time to Die (Smith novel), a 1989 novel by Wilbur Smith
 A Time to Die, a 2002 novel by Robert Moore about the 2000 Kursk submarine disaster
 A Time to Die (Star Trek), a 2004 Star Trek: The Next Generation novel by John Vornholt
 A Time to Die, a 2016 novel by Tom Wood

Music
 Time to Die (The Dodos album), 2009
 Time to Die (Electric Wizard album), 2014
 Time to Die (Christine Ott album), 2021
 "Time to Die", a song by Gary Numan from Strange Charm, 1986
 "Time to Die", a song by Dungeon from Demolition, 1996

Video games
 Time to Die, another name for the 1985 computer game Borrowed Time

See also
 Tiempo de morir, a 1965 Mexican drama film
 The Time to Die, a 1970 French crime film
 No Time to Die (disambiguation)